Andrew Michael Smith (born 3 June 1984) is an English badminton player.

Career
He had won the New Zealand International in 2004, the Australian International in 2004 and 2005, and also the Croatian International and the Vietnam Open in 2006. In 2008, he made it into the quarter finals of India Open and semifinals of Singapore Super Series.

Smith competed at the 2006 IBF World Championships. He defeated Pablo Abián of Spain 21–15, 21–13 in the first round. Then was defeated by Sony Dwi Kuncoro of Indonesia 21–19, 21–13.

Although possessing a World ranking of 17, he didn't attend the English National Championships in Manchester in 2007. He represented Great Britain in the badminton men's singles at the 2008 Beijing Olympic Games.

Achievements

IBF World Grand Prix (1 title) 
The World Badminton Grand Prix sanctioned by International Badminton Federation (IBF) since 1983.

Men's singles

BWF International Challenge/Series (6 titles, 7 runners-up)
Men's singles

Men's doubles

 BWF International Challenge tournament
 BWF International Series tournament
 BWF Future Series tournament

References

External links
 
 
 
 
 

1984 births
Living people
Sportspeople from Portsmouth
English male badminton players
Badminton players at the 2008 Summer Olympics
Olympic badminton players of Great Britain